Bambusa beecheyana is a species of Bambusa bamboo.

Synonyms

Distribution 
Bambusa beecheyana is found in Southern China to Indo-China and Taiwan.

Description 
Bambusa beecheyana is perennial and caespitose with short rhizomes. Its culms are erect, allowing it to grow 600 cm in height.

References 

beecheyana
Flora of Indo-China
Flora of China
Flora of Taiwan
Plants described in 1868